The Hayago Championship was a Go competition.

Outline
The Hayago Championship was a hayago tournament, where each player had to make moves within 10 seconds. The tournament was sponsored by TV Tokyo.

Past winners

Go competitions in Japan